Unione Sportiva Salernitana 1919, commonly referred to as Salernitana, is
an Italian football club based in Salerno, Campania. The original club was founded in 1919 and has been reconstituted three times in the course of its history, most recently in 2011. The current club is the heir of the former Salernitana Calcio 1919 and it restarted from Serie D in the 2011–12 season. Salernitana returned to Serie A in 2021, after a break of 23 seasons, having finished second in Serie B.

History

From Unione Sportiva Salernitana to Salernitana Calcio 1919

The Salerno-based club was originally founded in 1919 as the Unione Sportiva Salernitana. The club was known as Società Sportiva Salernitanaudax for a time during the 1920s following a merger with Audax Salerno.  In 1978, the club was renamed Salernitana Sport.  The club has spent the majority of their history at the Serie B and Serie C levels of Italian football.

Salernitana play their home matches at Stadio Arechi.
In their early years, Salernitana competed in the regional Italian Football Championship. They played at this level for four seasons during the 1920s. Since that time the club returned to the top level of Italian football twice; they played in Serie A during 1947–48 and 1998–99.

In 2005, the club went bankrupt but was restarted by Antonio Lombardi, changing the name from Salernitana Sport to Salernitana Calcio 1919.

In 2011, the club did not appeal against a decision by Commissione di Vigilanza sulle Società di Calcio Professionistiche (Co.Vi.So.C) and was excluded from Italian football.

Club refoundation: from Serie D to the top flight

On 21 July 2011, following the exclusion of the original Salernitana club, Salerno mayor Vincenzo De Luca, in compliance with Article 52 of N.O.I.F., assigned the new title to Marco Mezzaroma, brother-in-law of Lazio owner and chairman Claudio Lotito. The new club was admitted to Serie D under the denomination of Salerno Calcio.

In the 2011–12 season, Salernitana was immediately promoted to Lega Pro Seconda Divisione after winning Group G of Serie D.

On 12 July 2012, the club was renamed US Salernitana 1919. In the 2012–13 Lega Pro Seconda Divisione season, Salernitana finished first in Girone B, and was promoted to Lega Pro Prima Divisione. This was the second consecutive promotion for the team. Finally Salernitana won Group C of Lega Pro and returned Serie B in 2014–15 season.

After several seasons at Serie B level, Salernitana won promotion to Serie A at the end of the 2020–21 Serie B season under the tenure of head coach Fabrizio Castori, finishing in 2nd place behind champions Empoli. Promotion was secured with a 3–0 victory over Pescara on the final matchday. Salernitana's return to Serie A however required Lotito and Mezzaroma to sell the club, due to Italian football laws not allowing two clubs from the same owner to play in the same league. On 7 July 2021, the FIGC Federal Council approved the trust of Salernitana to take control of the club, meaning it was officially enrolled in Serie A for the first time in 23 years.

Return to Serie A: 2021–present

Salernitana's first match in its return to the top flight was a 3–2 defeat against Bologna on 22 August 2021. After a poor start to the season, earning only one point from the first six matches, the club picked up its first Serie A victory against Genoa on matchday seven, winning 1–0 due to a goal from Milan Đurić. In October, the Salernitana board fired Castori after a 2–1 loss to Spezia had left the club at the bottom of the table, with four points from their opening eight league games. Stefano Colantuono was named as his replacement, returning for a second spell as head coach having previously led Salernitana from December 2017 to December 2018.
On 22 May 2022, Salernitana avoided relegation by finishing with the lowest points tally in Serie A history with just 31 points.  Salernitana managed to pull off the great escape by securing 18 points from their last 15 matches.

Colours, badge and nicknames

Salernitana originally wore light blue and white striped shirts, known in Italy as biancocelesti. The blue on the shirt was chosen to represent the sea, as Salerno lies right next to the Gulf of Salerno and has a long tradition as a port city. In the 1940s, the club changed to garnet coloured shirts, which has gained them the nickname granata in their homeland.

During the 2011–12 season their kit colours were striped blue and deep red, resembling F.C. Barcelona.  The symbol of St. Matthew, patron saint of Salerno, was also a part of the redesigned kit.

Since renaming the club US Salernitana 1919, however, their home colours have again been the traditional garnet.

The 100th anniversary logo was announced on June 24, 2019, and appeared on their 2019–20 season kits.

Honours

League
Serie B:
Winners: 1946–47 (Group C), 1997–98
Serie C / Serie C1:
Winners: 1937–38; 1965–66; 2007–08; 2014–15
Lega Pro Seconda Divisione / Serie C2:
Winner: 2012–13
Serie D:
Winner: 2011–12 (as Salerno Calcio)

Cups
Coppa Italia Serie C:
Winners: 2013–14 
 Supercoppa di Lega di Seconda Divisione
 Winners: 2012–13

Divisional movements

Players

Current squad

Other players under contract

Players out on loan

Non-playing staff

National team players
These current and former players have recorded starts for their respective national teams.

Players from the Italy national football team:

  Roberto Breda
  David Di Michele
  Marco Di Vaio
  Salvatore Fresi
  Gennaro Gattuso
  Francesco Caputo
  Walter Zenga
  Pasquale Mazzocchi

Players from other national football teams:

  Franck Ribéry
  Vid Belec
  Stefan Strandberg
  Frédéric Veseli
  Mamadou Coulibaly
  Lassana Coulibaly
  Wajdi Kechrida
  Milan Đurić
  Simeon Nwankwo (Simy)
  Joel Obi
  Erjon Bogdani
  Andrei Cristea
  Francesco Di Jorio
  Bülent Eken
  Krzysztof Piątek
  Norbert Gyömbér
  Tonny Vilhena
  Phil Masinga
  Roberto Merino
  Ruslan Nigmatullin
  Siyabonga Nomvethe
  Rigobert Song
  Danny Tiatto
  Marco Zoro
  Diego Valencia
  Guillermo Ochoa

World Cup players
The following players have been selected by their country in the World Cup Finals, while playing for Salernitana.

  Krzysztof Piątek (2022)
  Boulaye Dia (2022)

  Dylan Bronn (2022)

Managers

 Géza Kertész (1929–31)
 Pietro Leone (1931–32)
 Ferenc Hirzer (1936–38)
  Attila Sallustro (1939)
 Ferenc Hirzer (1940–41)
 Géza Kertész (1943–44)
 Giuseppe Viani (1946–48)
 Arnaldo Sentimenti (1950)
 Rodolphe Hiden (1951–52)
 Paolo Todeschini (1956–57)
 Nicolò Nicolosi (1958–59)
 Ettore Puricelli (1960–61)
 Gyula Zsengellér (1961–62)
 Rodolphe Hiden (1963–64)
 Pietro Magni (1969)
 Lucio Mujesan (1977)
 Enea Masiero (1977–78)
 Lucio Mujesan (1978)
 Lamberto Leonardi (1980–81)
 Romano Mattè (1981–82)
 Francisco Lojacono (1982–83)
 Mario Facco (1983–84)
 Gian Piero Ghio (1984–86)
 Lamberto Leonardi (1989)
 Giovanni Simonelli (1991–92)
 Tarcisio Burgnich (1991–92)
 Giuliano Sonzogni (1992–93)
 Delio Rossi (1993–95)
 Franco Colomba (1995–97)
 Delio Rossi (1997–99)
 Luigi Cagni (1999–2000)
 Nedo Sonetti (2000–01)
 Zdeněk Zeman (2001–02)
 Stefano Pioli (2003–04)
 Angelo Gregucci (2004–05)
 Stefano Cuoghi (2005–06)
 Gianfranco Bellotto (2006–07)
 Andrea Agostinelli (2007)
 Fabio Brini (2008)
 Fabrizio Castori (2008)
 Bortolo Mutti (2008–09)
 Fabrizio Castori (2009)
 Fabio Brini (2009)
 Marco Cari (2009)
 Gianluca Grassadonia (2010)
 Roberto Breda (2010–11)
 Carlo Perrone (2011–12)
 Giuseppe Galderisi (2012)
 Carlo Perrone (2012–13)
 Stefano Sanderra (2013)
 Carlo Perrone (2013)
 Angelo Gregucci (2014)
 Mario Somma (2014)
 Leonardo Menichini (2014–15)
 Vincenzo Torrente (2015–16)
 Leonardo Menichini (2016)
 Giuseppe Sannino (2016)
 Alberto Bollini (2016–17)
 Stefano Colantuono (2017–18)
 Angelo Gregucci (2018–19)
 Leonardo Menichini (2019)
 Gian Piero Ventura (2019–20)
 Fabrizio Castori (2020–21)
 Stefano Colantuono (2021–22)
 Davide Nicola (2022–23)
 Paulo Sousa (2023–)

References

Further reading

External links

 

 
Football clubs in Italy
Football clubs in Campania
Association football clubs established in 1919
2005 establishments in Italy
2011 establishments in Italy
Serie A clubs
Serie B clubs
Serie C clubs
Serie D clubs
1919 establishments in Italy
Phoenix clubs (association football)
Coppa Italia Serie C winning clubs